Dominic LaRiccia (born May 23, 1971) is an American politician who has served in the Georgia House of Representatives from the 169th district since 2015.

References

1971 births
Living people
People from Douglas, Georgia
21st-century American politicians
Republican Party members of the Georgia House of Representatives